Line 8 (Diamond), formerly Line B (Gray), is a line of the São Paulo Metropolitan Trains system in Greater São Paulo, Brazil. Since 27 January 2022, ViaMobilidade operates the line for 30 years, along with Line 9-Emerald.

Stations

Amador Bueno Extension

Mairinque Extension 

Since the establishment of suburban trains in the late 1920s, their services have connected São Paulo to the city of Mairinque. With the creation of Fepasa in 1971, the suburban section was transferred to the Regional Suburbs Unit. This regional unit was expanded in the 1970s and transformed into a Metropolitan Regional Division (DRM).

In the 1980s, the service underwent some renovations, with the introduction of the Toshiba trains renovated in Rio Claro and the construction or renovation of the existing stops between Mairinque and Amador Bueno, equipped only with shelters and "humps" for easy boarding of passengers. The service was officially known as "Trem de Mairinque" and nicknamed "Mairinquinho". In 1987, the city of São Roque even considered an agreement with Fepasa for the integration of trains with the bus network of the then public company SanTC (São-Roquense de Transportes Colectivos), but the proposal did not move forward.

References

External links

 Official page of the CPTM
 Secretaria dos Transportes Metropolitanos

Companhia Paulista de Trens Metropolitanos
CPTM 08